Todd Woodbridge and Mark Woodforde defeated the defending champions Jacco Eltingh and Paul Haarhuis in the final, 6–2, 7–5 to win the senior gentlemen's invitation doubles tennis title at the 2016 Wimbledon Championships.

Draw

Final

Group A
Standings are determined by: 1. number of wins; 2. number of matches; 3. in two-players-ties, head-to-head records; 4. in three-players-ties, percentage of sets won, or of games won; 5. steering-committee decision.

Group B
Standings are determined by: 1. number of wins; 2. number of matches; 3. in two-players-ties, head-to-head records; 4. in three-players-ties, percentage of sets won, or of games won; 5. steering-committee decision.

References
Senior Gentlemen's Invitation Doubles

Men's Senior Invitation Doubles